Ophisops elegans, commonly known as the snake-eyed lizard, is a species of lizard in the family Lacertidae. The species is endemic to the Mediterranean region and Central Asia. There are nine recognized subspecies.

Description
O. elegans has the following distinguishing characters: Head moderate, feebly depressed. Upper head-shields smooth or slightly rugose; nostril lateral, pierced between on upper and a lower nasal, and followed by one or two postnasals; frontonasal single; four supra-oculars, first and fourth very small, the two principal separated from the supraciliaries by a series of granules: occipital small, in contact with or separated from the interparietal; subocular bordering the lip, normally between the fourth and fifth upper labials; temporal scales small, smooth; usually two large supratemporal shields bordering the parietal; a large tympanic shield. A. gular fold may be distinguishable; collar absent or feebly marked. Dorsal scales variable in size, as large as or larger than the laterals; 30 to 40 scales round the middle of the body, ventrals included. A more or less enlarged postero-median preanal plate. The hind limb reaches about the ear in the male, the shoulder or a little beyond in the female. 7 to 12 (usually 9 to 11) femoral pores on each side. Tail about twice as long as head and body. Olive or bronzy above, with black spots usually forming longitudinal series, sometimes forming a network; frequently and or two light longitudinal streaks on each side; lower surfaces white.

From snout to vent 2 inches (5 cm); tail 4 inches (10 cm).

Subspecies
The following nine subspecies are recognized as being valid, including the nominotypical subspecies.
Ophisops elegans basoglui 
Ophisops elegans blanfordi 
Ophisops elegans budakibarani 
Ophisops elegans centralanatoliae 
Ophisops elegans ehrenbergerii 
Ophisops elegans elegans 
Ophisops elegans macrodactylus 
Ophisops elegans persicus 
Ophisops elegans schlueteri 

Nota bene: A trinomial authority in parentheses indicates that the subspecies was originally described in a genus other than Ophisops.

Etymology
The subspecific name, schlueteri, is in honor of Wilhelm Schlüter, who was a German dealer of natural history specimens.

Geographic range
O. elegans is found in E Georgia, Armenia, Azerbaijan, SE Bulgaria, NE Greece (Lesbos, Limnos, Chios, Samos, Samothraki, Agathonisi, Psara), Cyprus, Turkey, Algeria, Libya, Egypt, W Syria, Lebanon, Israel, W Jordan,  Iraq, Iran (Kavir desert), N Pakistan, NW India.

Races:
O. e. basoglui – S Anatolia
O. e. blanfordi – Pakistan
O. e. centralanatolia – C Anatolia
O. e. ehrenbergi – Kalymnos, Lesbos etc.
O. e. elegans – Turkey (including Anatolia)
O. e. macrodactylus – W Turkey, Greece (Lesbos etc.)
O. e. schlueteri – Cyprus

Type locality: Baku, Azerbaijan.

Habitat

Reproduction
O. elegans is oviparous.

References

Further reading
Bischoff W (1974). "Echsen des Kaukasus, Teil 7. Die Europäische Schlangenaugen-Eidechse Ophisops elegans Menetries 1832 ". Aquar. Terr. B21: 340-343. (in German).
Lantz AL (1930). "Note sur la forme typique d' O. elegans Ménétries. Bull. Mus. Géorgie 6: 31-42. (in French).
Ménétries E (1832). Catalogue raisonné des objets de zoologie recueillis dans un voyage au caucase et jusqu'aux frontières actuelles de la Perse. Saint Petersburg, Russia: L'Académie Impériale des Sciences de St.-Pétersbourg. 330 pp. (Ophisops elegans, new species, pp. 63-64). (in French).
Olgun, Kurtuluş; Tok, Cemal Varol (1999). "Ihlara Vadisi (Aksaray)'nden toplanan Ophisops elegans (Sauria: Lacertidae) ornekleri hakkinda ". Turkish Journal of Zoology 23 (Turkish Supplement 3): 807-810. (in Turkish).
Schlüter U (2003). "Zur Kenntnis des Westlichen Schlangenauges, Ophisops occidentalis (Boulenger 1887)". Elaphe 11 (3): 56-63. (in German).
Tok, Cemal Varol; Kumlutas, Yusuf; Türkozan, Oguz (1997). "On Specimens of Ophisops elegans Menetries 1832, (Sauria; Lacertidae) Collected From Hatay, Turkey". Turk. J. Zool. 21: 195-203.

External links
Ophisops elegans at The Checklist of Armenia's Amphibians and Reptiles at Tadevosyan's Herpetological Resources. Accessed 30 March 2007.

Ophisops
Reptiles described in 1832
Lizards of Europe
Lizards of Asia
Reptiles of Azerbaijan
Reptiles of Pakistan
Fauna of the Middle East
Taxa named by Édouard Ménétries